Biglar (also Romanized as Bīglar, Beyglar, Baglar, and Bayglar; also known as Bāilar and Bāylar) is a village in Abgarm Rural District, Abgarm District, Avaj County, Qazvin Province, Iran. At the 2006 census, its population was 120, in 26 families.

References 

Populated places in Avaj County